Abdelkrim El Hadrioui (born 6 March 1972) is a retired Moroccan professional footballer who played as a left-back.

Career
Born in Taza, Hadrioui began his career at AS.FAR, helping them win one league title. In January 1997, after the sale of Dimas to Juventus, Mário Wilson, who managed AS.FAR a year before, recommend him to Benfica, who subsequently signed him. He made his league debut on 1 March 1997 in a 3–1 loss against Chaves and quickly took the starting role from Pedro Henriques. He scored his first and only goal for Benfica on the 1997 Taça de Portugal Final lost to Boavista. After the arrival of Scott Minto and Graeme Souness, his influence was greatly reduced, only appearing sporadically throughout his second year, but still bagged 20 matches, for a total for 28 appearances for Benfica.

In 1998, he moved to AZ Alkmaar, becoming an undisputed starter, and even attracting attention of other clubs, such as Celtic in August 2000. After four seasons at Alkmaar, El Hadrioui moved to Belgian, playing for two years with Charleroi, retiring in 2005 at the age of 33 years after a one-year spell with Ittihad Khemisset.

Internationally, he was a member of the Morocco national football team that competed at the 1994 FIFA World Cup in the United States and 1998 FIFA World Cup in France. He also participated at the 1992 Summer Olympics.

Career statistics

International goals

References

External links
 
 
 

1972 births
Living people
Moroccan footballers
Moroccan expatriate footballers
Morocco international footballers
1994 FIFA World Cup players
1998 FIFA World Cup players
Footballers at the 1992 Summer Olympics
Olympic footballers of Morocco
1998 African Cup of Nations players
2000 African Cup of Nations players
AS FAR (football) players
S.L. Benfica footballers
R. Charleroi S.C. players
AZ Alkmaar players
Eredivisie players
Primeira Liga players
Moroccan expatriate sportspeople in Portugal
Moroccan expatriate sportspeople in the Netherlands
Moroccan expatriate sportspeople in Belgium
Expatriate footballers in Portugal
Expatriate footballers in the Netherlands
Expatriate footballers in Belgium
Association football defenders
People from Taza
Ittihad Khemisset players
Mediterranean Games bronze medalists for Morocco
Mediterranean Games medalists in football
Competitors at the 1991 Mediterranean Games